Kaiaua Bay is a bay on the  East Coast of New Zealand's North Island, ten kilometres north of Tolaga Bay. It is under the jurisdiction the Gisborne District Council.

The New Zealand Ministry for Culture and Heritage gives a translation of "eating mullets" for Kaiaua.

The 1947 tsunami was 6' high when it hit the area.

References

Bays of the Gisborne District